Oscar José Zamora Sosa is a former professional baseball player. A right-handed pitcher, he played all or part of four seasons in Major League Baseball, playing for the Chicago Cubs during 1974–76, and the Houston Astros in 1978.

In his career, he had 13 wins against 14 losses, and an earned run average of 4.53. 

After his Major League career was over, Zamora then pitched for the Miami Amigos of the Inter-American League in 1979. Zamora was running a shoe business at the time, so he only attended games when he was pitching.

Notes

External links
, or Pura Pelota

1944 births
Living people
Cardenales de Lara players
Cuban expatriate baseball players in Venezuela
Charleston Charlies players
Chicago Cubs players
Cocoa Astros players
Columbus Astros players
Denver Bears players
Dubuque Packers players
Houston Astros players
Industriales de Valencia players
Major League Baseball pitchers
Major League Baseball players from Cuba
Cuban expatriate baseball players in the United States
Miami Marlins (FSL) players
Navegantes del Magallanes players
Oklahoma City 89ers players
Pawtucket Indians players
Peninsula Astros players
Sportspeople from Camagüey
Portland Beavers players
Reno Silver Sox players
Salinas Indians players
Tiburones de La Guaira players
Tigres de Aragua players
Waterbury Indians players
Wichita Aeros players
Miami Amigos players